"The Witch's Trance-Dance" is a short story by Pu Songling first published in Strange Tales from a Chinese Studio.

Plot
In Jinan, and even more so in Beijing, elderly female shamans are often invited to sick beds to perform a ritual known as tiaoshen intended to drive away the illness; they are also asked to bless newly-weds. Pu Songling goes on to describe in detail the practices of these witches.

Literary significance
Sidney Sondergard writes that "there is certainly nothing sectarian about Pu Songling's depiction of the deities of Buddhism and Daoism, which is keeping with his eclectic enthusiasm for all things beyond the mundane"; in "The Witch's Trance-Dance", he "open-mindedly depicts practices associated with folk beliefs that aren't part of a preexisting religious system". Ma Ruifang likewise notes the vivid description of northern Chinese withcraft in the story, while arguing that Pu is satirising the fraudulent practices of the witches.

References

Citations

Bibliography

 
 

Stories within Strange Tales from a Chinese Studio